Sandeep Michael (23 June 1985 – 23 November 2018) was an Indian field hockey player who played as a forward for the national team.

Michael won the Most Promising Player award at the 2003 Men's Hockey Asia Cup which India won. He captained the national junior team to gold in the 2004 Men's Hockey Junior Asia Cup. He was employed with Air India.

Sandeep Michael died on 23 November 2018 in Bangalore after a brief illness, wherein he had slipped into a coma.

References

External links
Player profile at bharatiyahockey.org

1985 births
2018 deaths
Field hockey players from Bangalore
Indian male field hockey players